Adela oplerella is a species of moth of the family Adelidae, the fairy longhorn moths. It is known commonly as Opler's longhorn moth. It is endemic to California.

The forewings are dark, metallic olive-bronze. They are either without markings or with two faint whitish spots. The hindwings are slightly narrower and dark brown, with some bronze and purplish.

The moth has usually been collected on creamcups (Platystemon californicus).

The species was described in 1969 and named for Paul A. Opler, who collected most of the specimens.

References

External links
Adela oplerella. CalPhotos

Adelidae
Moths described in 1969
Endemic fauna of California
Moths of North America